Bossley may refer to:

 Bossley Park, suburb of Sydney, Australia
 Mike Bossley, Australian environmentalist
 Pete Bossley, (born 1950), New Zealand architect

See also
 Bosley, village and civil parish in Cheshire, England